George Murray Fullerton (8 December 1922 – 19 November 2002) was a South African cricketer who played in seven Tests from 1947 to 1951.

References

1922 births
2002 deaths
Gauteng cricketers
South Africa Test cricketers
Wicket-keepers